Geld is a surname literally meaning "gold" or "money" in some Germanic languages. Notable people with the surname include:

Gary Geld (born 1935), American composer
Karyl Geld Miller,  American screenwriter, political cartoonist, and commentator

See also

Gelt (disambiguation)

Germanic-language surnames